Arturo Martini (1889–1947) was a leading Italian sculptor between World War I and II. He moved between a very vigorous (almost ancient Roman) classicism and modernism. He was associated with public sculpture in fascist Italy, but later renounced his medium altogether.

Futurism
Martini seems to have been an active supporter of the Futurist movement between 1914 and 1918. He certainly corresponded with Umberto Boccioni and produced a modernist booklet in 1918. His early works show an archaic tendency, two-dimensionality and polychrome effects

In Fascist Italy
His later works returned to a more traditional style, but with "irony, agility and an eclectic capacity to combine or reinterpret sources". Between the wars, he became the semi-official sculptor of the fascist regime. He was literally overwhelmed by commitments: great monuments and commemorative works for courthouses, churches and universities. Examples include the great bronze at La Sapienza University in Rome and the memorial to the aviator Tito Minniti. He sculpted the monument to the Fallen at the Palazzo delle Poste, Naples.

Post-war
After the fall of Mussolini, feeling that his art had been corrupted, he published an essay against sculpture in the magazine La Martini in 1945: "scultura, lingua morta" (sculpture, a dead language). He writes for example: "La scultura un'arte è da n*gri e senza pace" (sculpture is a black and unquiet art).

Despite this attack on his own métier, he created one significant work after the war, a marble sculpture in a tribute to the guerrilla leader Primo Visentin, known as "Masaccio", who had been killed at the end of the war in Loria (Padua) in unexplained circumstances.

Martini worked with many materials (clay, wood, plaster, stone, especially marble, bronze, silver) but never moved far from figuration, although he was able to model abstract forms, as his atmosfera di una testa (vibrations of a head) of 1944 testifies. He exercised great influence on later Italian sculptors such as Marino Marini, Emilio Greco, Marcello Mascherini, Pericle Fazzini, and his student Fiore de Henriquez.

Gallery

References

Bibliography

 Pontiggia Elena, I volti e il cuore. La figura femminile da Ranzoni a Sironi e Martini, catalogo della mostra, Verbania, Museo del Paesaggio 2017 
 Gianni Vianello, Claudia Gian Ferrari, Nico Stringa, Arturo Martini. Catalogo ragionato delle sculture, Neri Pozza, Vicenza, 1998
 Nico Stringa, Arturo Martini, Gruppo editoriale L'Espresso, Roma, 2005
 Gian Ferrari Claudia, Elena Pontiggia, Velani Livia (a cura di), Arturo Martini, Milano, Skira Editore, 2006, 
 Antonella Crippa, Arturo Martini, catalogo online Artgate della Fondazione Cariplo, 2010, CC-BY-SA.
 Maria Gioia Tavoni, Riproporre il silenzio per le Contemplazioni di Arturo Martini, Faenza, Fratelli Lega Editori, 2017

External links 
 
 Web gallery of 20th Century figure sculpture
 1200 years of Italian sculpture (critical biography)

1889 births
1947 deaths
20th-century Italian sculptors
20th-century Italian male artists
Italian male sculptors